Manuela Ósk Harðardóttir (born 29 August 1983) is an Icelandic beauty queen and a model. She was crowned Miss Reykjavik and Miss Iceland in 2002. She represented her country in Miss Scandinavia and was 1st runner-up. She also went to compete in Miss Universe 2003 in Panama City. She was hospitalized two days before the pageant, due to dehydration, and could not compete.

Manuela married footballer Grétar Rafn Steinsson on 27 November 2007 in Alkmaar, Netherlands and they renewed their vows in 2009 in Reykjavik, Iceland. They got divorced in 2011.

In 2016 she completed her B.A. degree in Fashion design from the  Icelandic Academy of the Arts in Reykjavik. Currently she is studying for a B.A. in social media at FIDM, Los Angeles.

Since 2016, Manuela has been National Director for Miss Universe Iceland along with Jorge Esteban.

References

1983 births
Living people
Manuela Osk Hardardottir